"Nothin' 'bout Love Makes Sense" is a song written by Gary Burr, Joel Feeney and Kylie Sackley, and performed by American country music artist LeAnn Rimes.  It was released in August 2004 as the first single from Rimes' album This Woman. The song peaked at number five on the Billboard Hot Country Singles & Tracks chart.  A music video was also released in 2004 for the song.

Chart performance
"Nothin' 'bout Love Makes Sense" debuted at number 57 on the U.S. Billboard Hot Country Singles & Tracks for the week of September 4, 2004.

Year-end charts

References

2004 singles
2004 songs
LeAnn Rimes songs
Songs written by Gary Burr
Song recordings produced by Dann Huff
Curb Records singles
Songs written by Joel Feeney
Songs written by Kylie Sackley